Russky Saskul (Urıś Haśıqküle) is a rural locality (a village) in Beloozersky Selsoviet, Gafuriysky District, Bashkortostan, Russia. The population was 338 as of 2010. There are 9 streets.

Geography 
Russky Saskul is located 21 km west of Krasnousolsky (the district's administrative centre) by road. Tsapalovka is the nearest rural locality.

References 

Rural localities in Gafuriysky District